Whisler Island is an uninhabited island within Qikiqtaaluk Region, Nunavut, Canada. An island within an island, it is located in Lake Hazen on Ellesmere Island within Quttinirpaaq National Park.

It was named for Private William Whisler, a member of the Lady Franklin Bay Expedition.

References

Ellesmere Island
Uninhabited islands of Qikiqtaaluk Region